Silang, officially the Municipality of Silang,  is a 1st class municipality in the province of Cavite, Philippines. According to the 2020 census, it has a population of 295,644 people.

Silang is located in the eastern section of Cavite. It is home to the Philippine National Police Academy, PDEA Academy, and International Institute of Rural Reconstruction head office.

With the continuous expansion of Metro Manila, the municipality is now part of the Manila's conurbation which spans southward toward Lipa City.

History

Pre-Hispanic period
The traditional origins of the town are attributed to ten Bornean datus who sailed northward on board balangays and ended in Silang through Taal Lake. Its first settlers were Gat Hingiw, his wife Gat Kaliwanag, and their seven children, who later moved to different parts of the town and established their respective barangays. Gat Pandan stayed in the original community and developed the area.

Spanish colonial era
During the start of the Spanish colonization of the Philippines, tracts of land were given by the King of Spain to the conquistadores and their descendants, who collected tributes from the people residing in their acquired lands. Silang originally belonged to the encomienda (land grant) of Diego Jorge de Villalobos; his claim extended to what is today the towns of Carmona, Amadeo, Indang, Alfonso, General Trias, and Tanza. For many years, Silang was one of the biggest towns, by the 20th century its land area was reduced to its current size, as some of its former villages later became independent towns. Indang was the first to be granted town status in 1655. By the 19th century, the town lost land to the towns of Carmona and Amadeo, and by 1938, the town's southern lands were ceded to become part of the city of Tagaytay.

The Silang encomienda was later purchased from King Ferdinand VI of Spain for 2,000 pesetas on March 9, 1746, to prevent it from becoming a "friar land" like the other towns of Cavite, executed through the representation of Bernabe Javier Manahan and Gervacio dela Cruz.

Contemporary history
On January 22, 2023, the municipality was certified by Guinness World Records as volunteers from the municipal government and the Catholic parish church successfully lit 621 candles in a world record attempt for longest line of candles lit in relay, surpassing 366 set in India in 2016. The attempt was held to commemorate the feast of Nuestra Señora de Candelaria.

Geography
It is bounded by General Trias, Dasmariñas, General Mariano Alvarez, and Carmona to the north, Biñan, Santa Rosa, Cabuyao, and Calamba to the east, Tagaytay to the south, and Amadeo to the west.

Barangays
Silang is politically subdivided into 64 barangays, 10 of them being disputed with Gen. Mariano Alvarez .

Climate 

Silang has a tropical savanna climate (Aw in the Köppen climate classification) with a pronounced dry season from November to April.

Demographics

Religion
The majority of the people in Silang are adherents of the Christian Faith, composed of Roman Catholics, Members Church of God International, Protestants, and members of independent Christian groups. Majority of the Christian population is composed of Roman Catholics.

Other Christian groups in the town include mainstream Protestants, congregations of Mormons, and other churches are also present in the town.

With the influx of migrants from other provinces, other non-Christian faiths, particularly Islam, is practiced in the town.

Economy 

Silang, like most of the towns in the province of Cavite, depends on a mainly agricultural economy. The primary crops grown in the area are coconut, coffee, corn, banana, pineapple, and tree crops like mango, lansones, caimito, santol, jackfruit, guava, and avocado. Fertile soils and abundant water sources make Silang suitable not only for common commercial crops but also for high value and exotic crops production. Most of the local farmers practice intercropping to increase land productivity and lessen soil erosion. Fruit production exceeds the demand of the municipality's population, thus, supply excesses are marketed to Metro Manila and neighboring urban centers. A number of poultry and swine farms are also located in some rural barangays.

Manufacturing and trade are Silang's other major sources of income. Trade and investments grew tremendously with the influx of both Manila-based and foreign investors. Total investments were estimated at P2.5 billion between 1996 and 2004, which helped bring about the employment of 3,000 people. Despite the slow down of progress in 2004, Land Value still soared, allowing investors to infiltrate and start business. The investment trend resulted in the increase in the price of prime realty from P3,000 to P15,000 per square meter and from P150 to P500 per square meter for raw lots in interior barangays. Trade establishments in Silang include gasoline stations, convenience stores, lumber/hardware traders, groceries, resorts, and hotels.

The dry goods section of the Silang Public Market can now accommodate 228 stalls.

Silang houses the Maguyam Industrial Complex and the Daichi Industrial Complex in addition to a total of ten factories operating outside the export processing zone.

Transportation

Silang can be reached by bus, or by jeepney.  Coming from Manila, it will take 2 hours to reach the town proper.  Silang is accessible by land transportation.  Major road networks to and from Laguna and Batangas traverse it making the town a potential trading center for agricultural products while enjoying an environment that is free of traffic and pollution problems. Commuters are assured of smooth travel within the borders of the municipality with of its good road networks of approximately 187.83 km.  Six major road projects were completed in 1996, being the Bulihan Resettlement Area Road, the 8-km Kaong-Maguyam Road, the Caramanzana Drive connecting the Silang Public Market with Aguinaldo Highway, the 2-km Sabutan-Iba Road, the DPWH funded Santa Rosa-Silang-Tagaytay Road, and the Malabag Road.

Landmarks

Lucsuhin Natural Bridge or Cabag Caves
Our Lady of Candelaria Parish Church of Silang

Government

Elected officials
Mayor: Kevin A. Anarna
Vice Mayor: Edward 'Ted' Carranza
Sangguniang Bayan Members:
Mark Anthony A. Toledo
Ivee Jayne A. Reyes
Ivan I. Amutan
Aristides Jose Virgillio A. Velazco
Perpetuo Desingaño 
Luis Junjang Batingal
Juan Carlo K. Madlansacay
Eric Cokiat Garcia
LNB President: Ortega, Domingo (Brgy. Kaong)
SKF President: Buhat, Robinson Jr. Ambita (Brgy. Lucsuhin)

List of chief executives
Gobernadorcillo (Leader of 'pueblo' or bayan during Spanish Era):

As the effect of the Maura Law in 1893, the tribunal del pueblo was changed to tribunal municipal and leaders of municipalities were called Capitan Municipal:
 Victor Belardo 1893–1894
 Nicolas Montoya 1895–1896
 Martin Medina 1896
 Isidoro Montoya 1896–1897
 Marcelo Madlansacay (former gobernadorcillo) 1897
 Vicente Poblete 1897–1898
 Jose Kiamzon 1898–1901

During the American Period, the 2nd commission passed the Municipal Code (Act No. 82) that created Municipalities. The leaders were called Presidente Municipal:
First Elections were held 1903. (Silang Historical Society)

Municipal Mayor(s):

Education
Public high schools:
 Kaong National High School 
 Lumil National High School 
 General Vito L. Belarmino National High School
 Malabag National High School
 Munting Ilog Integrated National High School – Main
 Bulihan National High School
 Emilia Ambalada Poblete National High School (Formerly: Munting Ilog National High School- Silang West Annex)

Private schools:

 New Life Christian School of Cavite
 Scuola di Scienza del Mija
 Cavite Institute
 La Belle Montessori School
 AIIAS Academy
 Lora Carnig School of All Nations
 Little Heirs Academy
 Sacred Hearts of Jesus and Mary Academe of Cavite
 Westridge Academy
 St.Scholastica's College-Westgrove
 Our Lady Of Peace Academy Of Cavite
 Mission and Vision Reformed Christian Academy
 Biga Achievers' Learning Institute
 Infant Jesus Academy of Silang
 Living Lamp Academy
 Silang Adventist Elementary School
 Hilltop Adventist Elementary School, Inc.
 Imperial Learning Center
 Father Michael Donoher Memorial School
 Trustworthy Learning Center

Catholic schools:
 The Sisters of Mary School – Boystown (Adlas Campus)
 The Sisters of Mary School – Girlstown (Biga Campus)
 Father Michael Donoher Memorial School
 Rogationist College
 Sacred Heart Villa School
 St. Scholastica's College – Westgrove
 Infant Jesus Academy of Silang
 Risen Christ Catholic School
 Paraclete Foundation Community School

Colleges, state colleges and universities:

 Sisters of Mary Technical Education Institute Cavite Inc.
 Adventist University of the Philippines
 Adventist International Institute of Advanced Studies
 Imus Computer College (ICC) – Silang Branch
 Cavite State University (Silang satellite campus)
 Far Eastern University (Silang satellite campus)
 Philippine Missionary Institute
 Unida Biblical Seminary
 Rogationist College
 PNPA (Public Safety College)
 St. Benilde Montessori College
 Saint Paul Seminary 
 Our Lady of La Salette Seminary

Gallery

Health care
 Estrella Hospital
 Velazco Hospital
 Silang Specialist Medical Center

Notable people
 Bayani Agbayani (b.1969), comedian and afternoon daily variety show host of Lunch Out Loud

References

External links

 [ Philippine Standard Geographic Code]

 
Municipalities of Cavite